The Sena dynasty was a Hindu dynasty during the early medieval period on the Indian subcontinent, that ruled from Bengal through the 11th and 12th centuries. The empire at its peak covered much of the north-eastern region of the Indian subcontinent. The rulers of the Sena Dynasty traced their origin to the south Indian region of Karnataka.

The dynasty's founder was Samanta Sena. After him came Hemanta Sena who usurped power and styled himself, king, in 1095 AD. His successor Vijaya Sena (ruled from 1096 AD to 1159 AD) helped lay the foundations of the dynasty, and had an unusually long reign of over 60 years. Ballala Sena conquered Gaur from the Pala, became the ruler of the Bengal Delta, and made Nadia the capital as well. Ballala Sena married Ramadevi a princess of the Western Chalukya Empire which indicates that the Sena rulers maintained close social contact with south India. Lakshmana Sena succeeded Ballala Sena in 1179, ruled Bengal for approximately 20 years, and expanded the Sena Empire to  Odisha, Bihar and probably to Varanasi. In 1203–1204 AD, Bakhtiyar Khalji, a general under the Ghurid Empire, attacked and captured the capital City of Nadia.

Origins
Deopara Prashasti described the founder of Sena dynasty Samanthasena,  as a migrant Brahmaksatriya from Karnataka. The epithet 'Brahma-Kshatriya' suggests that Senas were Brahmins by caste who took the profession of arms and became Kshatriyas. The Sena kings were also probably Baidyas, according to historian P.N. Chopra.

The Senas entered into the service of Palas as sāmantas in Rāḍha, probably under Samantasena. With the decline of the Pālas, their territory had expanded to include Vaṅga and a part of Varendra by the end of Vijayasena's reign. The Palas were ousted in totality, and their entire territory annexed sometime after 1665.

Inscriptions
A copperplate was found in the Adilpur or Edilpur pargana of Faridpur District in 1838 A.D. and was acquired by the Asiatic Society of Bengal, but now the copperplate is missing from the collection. An account of the copperplate was published in the Dacca Review and Epigraphic Indica. The copperplate inscription is written in Sanskrit and in Ganda character, and dated 3rd jyaistha of 1136 samval, or 1079 A.D. In the Asiatic Society's proceeding for January 1838, an account of the copperplate states that three villages were given to a Brahman in the third year of Keshava Sena.  The grant was given with the landlord rights, which include the power of punishing the Chandrabhandas or Sundarbans, a tribe that lived in the forest. The land was granted in the village of Leliya in the Kumaratalaka mandala, which is situated in shatata-padamavati-visaya. The copperplate of Keshava Sena records that the king Vallala Sena carried away, from the enemies, the goddesses of fortune on palanquins (Shivaka), which elephant tusk staff supported; and also states that Vallala Sena's son, Lakshmana Sena (1179–1205), erected pillars of victory and sacrificial posts at Varanasi, Allahabad, and Adon Coast of the South Sea. The copperplate also describes the villages with smooth fields growing excellent paddy, the dancing and music in ancient Bengal, and ladies adorned with blooming flowers. The Edilpur copperplate of Keshava Sena records that the king made a grant in favour of Nitipathaka Isvaradeva Sarman for the inside of the subha-varsha.

Society
The Sena rulers consolidated the caste system in Bengal. Although Bengal borrowed from the caste system of Mithila, caste was not so strong in Bengal as in Mithila.

Architecture
The Sena dynasty is famous for building Hindu temples and monasteries, which include the renowned Dhakeshwari Temple in what is now Dhaka, Bangladesh.

In Kashmir, the dynasty also likely built a temple knows as Sankara Gaureshwara.

Coinage
In the political history of Bengal,  Sena dynasty was a mighty ruling dynasty in power. Various currency names have been regularly mentioned in the Sena writings, such as Purana, Dharan, Dramma. These terms were used to mean a silver coin weighing 32 ratis (56.6 grains) or a karshapan weighing scale. The term Kapardaka Purana is seen as a medium of exchange in the writings of the Sena kings and other contemporary kings. Karpadak means cow; And 'Purana' is definitely a kind of silver coin. The conjunction ‘kapardaka-purana’ refers to a medium of exchange whose quality is equal to that of a purana or silver coin (56.6 grains), but which is actually calculated by the proportional denominator. The table found in the traditional arithmetic of Bengal contained 1260 cowries instead of one silver coin (Purana or Dramma). That is, the ratio of Purana and Kapardaka is 1: 1280. Reliable evidence of the widespread use of cowrie in early medieval Bengal has been found in excavations at Paharpur and Kalgang (Bihar near Bhagalpur). Early medieval Bengal saw the scarcity of precious coins and the widespread circulation of cowries. Scholars have long sought to explain the virtual limitations of coins at this time

Decline 

Downfall of Sena dynasty was destined under the rule of weak rulers of this dynasty. This dynasty started declining during the rule of Lakshmanasena who was the last significant Sena king. Sena kings continued to rule in eastern Bengal for some decades, but the main political power in Bengal passed to the Muslim Ghurid Empire.

Legacy 
The Senas and their descendants merged into the Kayastha caste-group, heralding them as the neo-Kshatriyas of Bengal — hence, Abul Fazl would write that Bengal had always been ruled by Kayasthas. The actual caste-status of Senas —notwithstanding the anachronism— remain contested in popular memory: premodern Baidya genealogies claim the Senas as their own which are agreed upon by some Brahmin genealogies but rejected by Kayastha ones.

Literature

The Sena rulers were also great patrons of literature. During the Pala dynasty and the Sena dynasty, major growth in Bengali was witnessed. Some Bengali authors believe that Jayadeva, the famous Sanskrit poet and author of Gita Govinda, was one of the Pancharatnas (five gems) in the court of Lakshmana Sena.
Dhoyin – himself an eminent court poet of Sena dynasty – mentions nine gems (ratna) in the court of Lakshmana Sena, among whom were:
 Govardhana
 Sarana
 Jayadeva
 Umapati
 Dhoyi/Dhoyin Kaviraja

See also
 Dhakeshwari Mata Temple, Kumortuli
 History of Bengal
 History of India
 Edilpur Copperplate

References

Sources

 Early History of India 3rd and revised edition by Vincent A Smith

External links
 

 
Dynasties of Bengal
Historical Hindu empires
Medieval India
Dynasties of India
Hindu dynasties
States and territories established in the 11th century